The 2021–22 Sam Houston State Bearkats women's basketball team represented Sam Houston State University during the 2021–22 NCAA Division I women's basketball season. The Bearkats, led by fourth year head coach Ravon Justice, play their home games at the Bernard Johnson Coliseum as members of the Western Athletic Conference.

This season was the Sam Houston State Bearkats' first as members of the Western Athletic Conference. Sam Houston State was one of four schools, all from Texas, that left the Southland Conference in July 2021 to join the WAC.

Previous season

Roster
Sources:

Schedule
Sources:

|-
!colspan=9 style=| Non–conference games

|-
!colspan=9 style=| WAC conference games

|-
!colspan=9 style=|WAC Tournament

See also
2021–22 Sam Houston State Bearkats men's basketball team

References

Sam Houston Bearkats women's basketball seasons
Sam Houston State
Sam Houston State Bearkats basketball
Sam Houston State Bearkats basketball